This is a list of the described species of the harvestman family Zalmoxidae. Data on Neotropical species is mostly taken from Joel Hallan's Biology Catalog. Data on Indo-Pacific species is taken from the Sharma et al. (2011) Zootaxa catalog.

 Absonus M. A. González-Sponga, 1987
 Absonus ayalai M. A. González-Sponga, 1987 — Venezuela
 Absonus caracasensis M. A. González-Sponga, 1987 — Venezuela

 Araguita M. A. González-Sponga, 1987
 Araguita speciosa M. A. González-Sponga, 1987 — Venezuela

 Avilaia González-Sponga, 1998
 Avilaia cordillerensis González-Sponga, 1998

 Azulitaia M. A. González-Sponga, 1987
 Azulitaia rubicunda M. A. González-Sponga, 1987 — Venezuela

 Buruquelia González-Sponga, 1999
 Buruquelia cornifera González-Sponga, 1999 — Venezuela

 Carayaca González-Sponga, 1998
 Carayaca ornata González-Sponga, 1998

 Cea M. A. González-Sponga, 1987
 Cea lanceolata M. A. González-Sponga, 1987 — Venezuela

 Cersa V. Silhavy, 1979
 Cersa kratochvili V. Silhavy, 1979 — Cuba

 Chamaia M. A. González-Sponga, 1987
 Chamaia convexa M. A. González-Sponga, 1987 — Venezuela

 Chirimena González-Sponga, 1999
 Chirimena brevigranulata González-Sponga, 1999

 Cochirapha Roewer, 1949
 Cochirapha rugipes Roewer, 1949 — Ecuador

 Cubiria M. A. González-Sponga, 1987
 Cubiria inflata González-Sponga, 1999
 Cubiria peculiaris M. A. González-Sponga, 1987 — Venezuela

 Curimaguanus González-Sponga, in Kury 2003
 Curimaguanus infrequentis (M. A. González-Sponga, 1987) — Venezuela

 Ethobunus Chamberlin, 1925
 Ethobunus acanthotibialis (Goodnight & Goodnight, 1953) — Mexico
 Ethobunus albitrochanteris (Roewer, 1933) — Costa Rica
 Ethobunus armatus (Roewer, 1954) — El Salvador
 Ethobunus atroluteus (Roewer, 1949) — Costa Rica
 Ethobunus brasiliensis (Mello-Leitão, 1941) — Brazil
 Ethobunus brevis (Roewer, 1949) — Costa Rica
 Ethobunus calvus (González-Sponga, 1998) — Venezuela
 Ethobunus ceriseus (Sørensen, 1932) — Costa Rica
 Ethobunus cubensis (V. Silhavy, 1979) — Cuba
 Ethobunus filipes (Roewer, 1949) — Costa Rica
 Ethobunus foliatus (Goodnight & Goodnight, 1983) — Costa Rica
 Ethobunus gertschi (Goodnight & Goodnight, 1942) — Panama
 Ethobunus goodnighti (Rambla, 1969) — Jamaica
 Ethobunus gracililongipes (M. A. González-Sponga, 1987) — Venezuela
 Ethobunus gracilipes (Roewer, 1949) — Costa Rica
 Ethobunus llorensis (Goodnight & Goodnight, 1983) — Costa Rica
 Ethobunus longus (Goodnight & Goodnight, 1942) — Costa Rica
 Ethobunus meridionalis (Caporiacco, 1951) — Venezuela
 Ethobunus minutus (Goodnight & Goodnight, 1977) — Belize
 Ethobunus misticus (Goodnight & Goodnight, 1977) — Belize
 Ethobunus parallelus (Goodnight & Goodnight, 1942) — Costa Rica
 Ethobunus pecki (Rambla, 1969) — Jamaica
 Ethobunus pilosus (Goodnight & Goodnight, 1953) — Mexico
 Ethobunus rectipes (Roewer, 1927) — Venezuela
 Ethobunus simplex Chamberlin, 1925 — Panama
 Ethobunus tarsalis (Banks, 1909) — Costa Rica
 Ethobunus tenuis (Roewer, 1949) — Costa Rica
 Ethobunus trochantericus (Roewer, 1949)
 Ethobunus tuberculatus (Goodnight & Goodnight, 1947) — Trinidad
 Ethobunus vitensis (Goodnight & Goodnight, 1983) — Costa Rica
 Ethobunus xiomarae (González-Sponga, 1998) — Venezuela
 Ethobunus zalmoxiformis (Roewer, 1949) — Costa Rica
 Ethobunus zebroides (V. Silhavy, 1979) — Cuba

 Exlineia Mello-Leitão, 1942
 Exlineia fulvescens Mello-Leitão, 1943 — Ecuador
 Exlineia milagroi Mello-Leitão, 1942 — Ecuador
 Exlineia rhinoceros Mello-Leitão, 1945 — Ecuador

 Galanomma Juberthie, 1970
 Galanomma microphthalma Juberthie, 1970 — Ecuador

 Garanhunsa Roewer, 1949
 Garanhunsa pectanalis Roewer, 1949 — Brazil

 Granulaia M. A. González-Sponga, 1997
 Granulaia stygnoides González-Sponga, 1997 — Venezuela

 Guagonia M. A. González-Sponga, 1987
 Guagonia multispina M. A. González-Sponga, 1987 — Venezuela

 Guayania González-Sponga, 1999
 Guayania inflata González-Sponga, 1999

 Haitonia M. A. González-Sponga, 1987
 Haitonia alba M. A. González-Sponga, 1987 — Venezuela

 Jajinia M. A. González-Sponga, 1987
 Jajinia bromeliaca M. A. González-Sponga, 1987 — Venezuela
 Jajinia jajinia González-Sponga, 1998 — Venezuela

 Junquito González-Sponga, 1999
 Junquito denticuloso González-Sponga, 1999

 Lara M. A. González-Sponga, 1987
 Lara absonustarsalis M. A. González-Sponga, 1987 — Venezuela

 Metapachylus F. O. Pickard-Cambridge, 1905
 Metapachylus gracilis F. O. Pickard-Cambridge, 1905 — Mexico

 Micro M. A. González-Sponga, 1987
 Micro obtusangulus M. A. González-Sponga, 1987 — Venezuela

 Niquitaia González-Sponga, 1999
 Niquitaia convexa González-Sponga, 1999

 Orituco M. A. González-Sponga, 1987
 Orituco gracilipalpi M. A. González-Sponga, 1987 — Venezuela
 Orituco pariensis M. A. González-Sponga, 1991 — Venezuela
 Orituco tuberculosa M. A. González-Sponga, 1987 — Venezuela
 Orituco tuyensis M. A. González-Sponga, 1987 — Venezuela

 Ovalia González-Sponga, 1999
 Ovalia spinosa González-Sponga, 1999

 Pachylicus Roewer, 1923
 Pachylicus acutus (Goodnight & Goodnight, 1942) — Mexico, Belize, Guatemala
 Pachylicus castaneus (Silhavy, 1979) — Cuba
 Pachylicus cotoensis Goodnight & Goodnight, 1983 — Costa Rica
 Pachylicus petrunkevitchi (Mello-Leitão, 1944) — Panama
 Pachylicus foveolatus Goodnight & Goodnight, 1983 — Costa Rica
 Pachylicus hirsutus (Roewer, 1949)
 Pachylicus hispidus Goodnight & Goodnight, 1983 — Costa Rica
 Pachylicus rugosus (Banks, 1909) — Costa Rica
 Pachylicus spinatus Goodnight & Goodnight, 1983 — Costa Rica

 Panaquire M. A. González-Sponga, 1987
 Panaquire calva M. A. González-Sponga, 1987 — Venezuela

 Panopiliops Roewer, 1949
 Panopiliops inops Goodnight & Goodnight, 1983 — Costa Rica
 Panopiliops reimoseri (Roewer, 1949) — Costa Rica

 Paraminuella Caporiacco, 1951
 Paraminuella bristowei Caporiacco, 1951 — Venezuela

 Paramo M. A. González-Sponga, 1987
 Paramo meridensis M. A. González-Sponga, 1987 — Venezuela
 Paramo regaladoi González-Sponga, 1999

 Parascotolemon Roewer, 1912
 Parascotolemon bipunctus (González-Sponga, 1987) — Venezuela
 Parascotolemon hirsutus (Goodnight & Goodnight, 1942) — Guyana
 Parascotolemon ornatus Roewer, 1912 — Fr.Guiana

 Phalangodinella Caporiacco, 1951
 Phalangodinella araguitensis M. A. González-Sponga, 1987 — Venezuela
 Phalangodinella arida M. A. González-Sponga, 1987 — Venezuela
 Phalangodinella bicalcanei M. A. González-Sponga, 1987 — Venezuela
 Phalangodinella calcanei M. A. González-Sponga, 1987 — Venezuela
 Phalangodinella callositas M. A. González-Sponga, 1987 — Venezuela
 Phalangodinella caporiaccoi M. A. González-Sponga, 1987 — Venezuela
 Phalangodinella coffeicola M. A. González-Sponga, 1987 — Venezuela
 Phalangodinella longipes M. A. González-Sponga, 1987 — Venezuela
 Phalangodinella pilosa M. A. González-Sponga, 1987 — Venezuela
 Phalangodinella pittieri M. A. González-Sponga, 1987 — Venezuela
 Phalangodinella roeweri Caporiacco, 1951
 Phalangodinella santaeroseae M. A. González-Sponga, 1987 — Venezuela
 Phalangodinella tropophyla M. A. González-Sponga, 1987 — Venezuela

 Phalangoduna Roewer, 1949
 Phalangoduna granosa Roewer, 1949 — Costa Rica

 Pijiguaia González-Sponga, 1998
 Pijiguaia albina González-Sponga, 1998

 Pilosa González-Sponga, 1999
 Pilosa pilosa González-Sponga, 1999

 Pirassunungoleptes H. Soares, 1966
 Pirassunungoleptes analis (Roewer, 1949) — Brazil
 Pirassunungoleptes calcaratus H. Soares, 1966 — Brazil
 Pirassunungoleptes lesserti (Roewer, 1949) — Bolivia

 Protodiasia Ringuelet, 1955
 Protodiasia saltensis Ringuelet, 1955 — Argentina

 Retropedis M. A. González-Sponga, 1987
 Retropedis magnapatella M. A. González-Sponga, 1987 — Venezuela

 Sivianus Roewer, 1949
 Sivianus titschacki Roewer, 1949 — Peru

 Soledadiella M. A. González-Sponga, 1987
 Soledadiella barinensis M. A. González-Sponga, 1987 — Venezuela
 Soledadiella macrochelae M. A. González-Sponga, 1987 — Venezuela
 Soledadiella pentaculeata González-Sponga, 1999

 Sphoeroforma M. A. González-Sponga, 1987
 Sphoeroforma familiaris M. A. González-Sponga, 1987 — Venezuela
 Sphoeroforma fernandezi M. A. González-Sponga, 1987 — Venezuela
 Sphoeroforma minima M. A. González-Sponga, 1987 — Venezuela
 Sphoeroforma pusilla M. A. González-Sponga, 1987 — Venezuela

 Spiniella M. A. González-Sponga, 1987
 Spiniella grandituberculosa M. A. González-Sponga, 1987 — Venezuela

 Stygnoleptes Banks, 1914
 Stygnoleptes analis Banks, 1914 — Costa Rica, Panama, Colombia
 Stygnoleptes crassus (Sørensen, 1932) — Colombia
 Stygnoleptes gibber (Roewer, 1954) — El Salvador
 Stygnoleptes sellatus (Roewer, 1954) — El Salvador
 Stygnoleptes tarmanus (Roewer, 1956) — Peru

 Taguaza González-Sponga, 1998
 Taguaza eliptica González-Sponga, 1998 — Venezuela

 Tegipiolus Roewer, 1949
 Tegipiolus pachypus Roewer, 1949 — Brazil

 Tiara M. A. González-Sponga, 1987
 Tiara unispina M. A. González-Sponga, 1987 — Venezuela

 Timoleon Sørensen, 1932
 Timoleon armatanalis Roewer, 1956 — Peru
 Timoleon crassipes Sørensen, 1932 — Colombia

 Traiania H. E. M. Soares & S. Avram, 1981
 Traiania abundantis M. A. González-Sponga, 1987 — Venezuela
 Traiania arairensis M. A. González-Sponga, 1987 — Venezuela
 Traiania cacaotera M. A. González-Sponga, 1987 — Venezuela
 Traiania cimarronera M. A. González-Sponga, 1987 — Venezuela
 Traiania debellardi M. A. González-Sponga, 1991 — Venezuela
 Traiania inexspectata M. A. González-Sponga, 1987 — Venezuela
 Traiania mujicai M. A. González-Sponga, 1987 — Venezuela
 Traiania orghidani H. E. M. Soares & S. Avram, 1981 — Venezuela
 Traiania simpatrica M. A. González-Sponga, 1987 — Venezuela
 Traiania simplex M. A. González-Sponga, 1987 — Venezuela
 Traiania torrealbai M. A. González-Sponga, 1987 — Venezuela
 Traiania triangularis M. A. González-Sponga, 1987 — Venezuela
 Traiania venadoensis González-Sponga, 1998 — Venezuela

 Unare M. A. González-Sponga, 1987
 Unare videodifficultatis M. A. González-Sponga, 1987 — Venezuela

 Unicornia M. A. González-Sponga, 1987
 Unicornia flava M. A. González-Sponga, 1987 — Venezuela

 Urachiche M. A. González-Sponga, 1987
 Urachiche nerysae M. A. González-Sponga, 1987 — Venezuela

 Viacha Roewer, 1949
 Viacha granulata Roewer, 1949 — Bolivia

 Weyrauchiana Roewer, 1952
 Weyrauchiana oxapampa Roewer, 1952 — Peru

 Yacambuia M. A. González-Sponga, 1987
 Yacambuia yacambuiensis M. A. González-Sponga, 1987 — Venezuela

 Zalmoxis Sørensen, in L. Koch 1886
 Zalmoxis armatus (Roewer, 1949) — New Guinea
 Zalmoxis armatipes Strand, 1910 — New Guinea
 Zalmoxis aspersus Roewer, 1949 — Milgrave I., Torres Strait
 Zalmoxis austerus Hirst, 1912 — New Guinea
 Zalmoxis australis (Roewer, 1949) — New Guinea
 Zalmoxis bonka (Forster, 1949) — Solomon Is.
 Zalmoxis bendis Sharma et al., 2012 — Borneo
 Zalmoxis brevipes (Roewer, 1949) — New Guinea
 Zalmoxis cardwellensis Foster, 1955 — Queensland
 Zalmoxis cheesmani (Roewer, 1949) — New Guinea
 Zalmoxis convexus (Roewer, 1949) — New Guinea
 Zalmoxis crassitarsis S. Suzuki, 1982 — Bismarck Archipelago
 Zalmoxis cuspanalis (Roewer, 1926) — Philippines
 Zalmoxis dammermani (Roewer, 1927) — Java
 Zalmoxis darwinensis Goodnight & Goodnight, 1948) — Australia
 Zalmoxis derzelas Sharma et al., 2012 — Philippines
 Zalmoxis gebeleizis Sharma et al., 2012 — Philippines
 Zalmoxis falcifer Sharma, 2012 — Queensland
 Zalmoxis furcifer Sharma, 2012 — Queensland
 Zalmoxis ferrugineus (Roewer,1912) — Seychelles Is.
 Zalmoxis granulatus (Loman, 1902) — Bismarck Archipelago
 Zalmoxis heynemani Suzuki, 1977 — Philippines
 Zalmoxis insula Forster, 1955 — Dauan I., Torres Strait
 Zalmoxis insularis (Roewer, 1949) — Fiji
 Zalmoxis jewetti (Goodnight & Goodnight, 1947) — New Guinea
 Zalmoxis kaiensis S. Suzuki, 1982 — Moluccas
 Zalmoxis kaktinsae Sharma, 2012 — New Caledonia
 Zalmoxis kotys Sharma et al., 2012 — Borneo
 Zalmoxis lavacaverna G. S. Hunt, 1993 — Queensland
 Zalmoxis lavongaiensis (Suzuki, 1985) — New Britain
 Zalmoxis luzonicus Roewer, 1949 — Philippines
 Zalmoxis maculosus (Roewer, 1949) — New Guinea
 Zalmoxis marchei Roewer, 1912 — Marianas
 Zalmoxis mendax Sharma, 2012 — New Caledonia
 Zalmoxis mindanaonica Suzuki, 1977 — Philippines
 Zalmoxis minimus Roewer, 1912 — New Guinea
 Zalmoxis mitobatipes (Roewer, 1926) — Philippines
 Zalmoxis muelleri (Mueller, 1917) — New Guinea
 Zalmoxis mutus (Roewer, 1949) — New Guinea
 Zalmoxis neobritanicus S. Suzuki, 1982 — Bismarck Archipelago
 Zalmoxis neocaledonicus Roewer, 1912 — New Caledonia
 Zalmoxis neoguinensis (Roewer, 1915) — New Guinea
 Zalmoxis occidentalis (Roewer, 1949) — Mauritius
 Zalmoxis pallidus (Roewer, 1915) — New Guinea
 Zalmoxis patellaris (Roewer, 1949) — New Guinea
 Zalmoxis perditus Sharma, 2012 — New Caledonia
 Zalmoxis ponapeus (Roewer, 1949) — Pohnpei, Micronesia
 Zalmoxis princeps Sharma, 2012 — New Caledonia
 Zalmoxis pumilus (Roewer, 1949) — New Guinea
 Zalmoxis pygmaeus Sørensen, in L. Koch 1886 — Fiji
 Zalmoxis remingtoni (Goodnight & Goodnight, 1948) — New Caledonia
 Zalmoxis robustus Sørensen, in L. Koch 1886 — Polynesia
 Zalmoxis sabazios Sharma et al., 2012 — Philippines
 Zalmoxis savesi (Simon, 1880) — New Caledonia
 Zalmoxis sarasinorum Roewer, 1913 — Sulawesi
 Zalmoxis sepikus (Roewer, 1949) — New Guinea
 Zalmoxis similis S. Suzuki, 1982 — Bismarck Archipelago
 Zalmoxis soerenseni Simon, 1892 — Philippines
 Zalmoxis solitarius (Roewer, 1916) — Pohnpei, Micronesia; Jaluit Atoll, Marshall Is.
 Zalmoxis spinicoxa Roewer, 1949 — New Guinea
 Zalmoxis thorelli (Roewer, 1915) — New Guinea
 Zalmoxis tuberculatus Goodnight & Goodnight, 1948 — New Caledonia
 Zalmoxis zibelthiurdos Sharma et al., 2012 — Borneo

References

 Joel Hallan's Biology Catalog: Zalmoxioidae
 Sharma, P.P. (2012). "New Australasian Zalmoxidae (Opiliones: Laniatores) and a new case of male polymorphism in Opiliones." Zootaxa 3236: 1-35.
 Sharma, P.P., Kury, A.B., & Giribet, G. (2011). "Zalmoxidae (Arachnida: Opiliones: Laniatores) of the Paleotropics: a catalogue of Southeast Asian and Indo-Pacific species." Zootaxa 2972: 37-58.

Zalmoxidae
Zalmoxidae